The Taifa of Purchena was a medieval Moorish taifa kingdom. Centered in Purchena, it existed from 1145 to 1150.

List of Emirs

Miqdamid dynasty
 Ibn Miqdam: fl. mid-12th century (1145–1150)
 To Murcia: c. 1150–1172

1150 disestablishments
States and territories established in 1145
Purchena